Wonders of the Universe is a 2011 book by the theoretical physicists Brian Cox and Andrew Cohen. The book is about cosmology and the universe,  and is explained in a way that is accessible to a general reader. The book is based on a series with the same name Wonders of the Universe.

References 

Popular physics books
Cosmology books
2011 non-fiction books
William Collins, Sons books